The Samsung Galaxy Z Fold 3 (stylized as Samsung Galaxy Z Fold3, sold as Samsung Galaxy Fold 3 in certain territories) is a foldable smartphone that is part of the Samsung Galaxy Z series. It was revealed by Samsung Electronics on August 11, 2021 at the Samsung Unpacked event alongside the Z Flip 3. It is the successor to the Samsung Galaxy Z Fold 2.

In March 2022, Samsung rebranded the device as "Galaxy Fold 3" in certain Eastern European territories for sensitivity reasons relating to the Russian invasion of Ukraine.

Specifications

Design 

The Z Fold 3's outer display and back panel use Gorilla Glass Victus, whilst the foldable inner display is made of Samsung's proprietary "Ultra-Thin Glass", with two protective plastic layers covering it. 

The Z Fold 3 has an IPX8 ingress protection rating for water resistance, with dust resistance not being rated. The outer frame is constructed from aluminum, marketed as 'Armor Frame' by Samsung, which is claimed to be 10% stronger than the Z Fold 2's aluminum frame.

Hardware 
The Galaxy Z Fold 3 has two screens: its outer screen, which is a 6.23-inch display with a 120 Hz variable refresh rate, and its foldable inner display, which is a 7.6-inch 120 Hz screen, featuring support for the S Pen Pro and the S Pen Fold Edition. 

The device has 12 GB of RAM, and either 256 or 512 GB of UFS 3.1 flash storage, with no support for expanding the device's storage capacity via micro-SD cards.

The Z Fold 3 is powered by the Qualcomm Snapdragon 888, upgraded from the Z Fold 2's Qualcomm Snapdragon 865+.

The device's included battery is a 4400 mAh dual-cell one that fast charges via a USB-C cable up to 25 W, or via wireless charging up to 10W. 

The Z Fold 3 features 3 rear cameras, including a 12MP wide-angle camera, 12MP ultra-wide camera, and a 12MP telephoto camera, and features two front facing cameras, a 10MP selfie camera on the outer display and a 4MP under-screen camera on the foldable inner display.

Samsung will disable camera-related functions if the user attempts to unlock the bootloader.

References

External links 
 

Samsung Galaxy
Foldable smartphones
Mobile phones introduced in 2021
Mobile phones with multiple rear cameras
Mobile phones with 4K video recording
Dual screen phone
Discontinued flagship smartphones
Samsung smartphones